Rising River is a stream in Shasta County, California, in the United States.

The river comes into sight suddenly at its source, hence the name.

See also
List of rivers of California

References

Rivers of Shasta County, California
Rivers of Northern California